Nizhnyaya Gorka is a rural locality (a village) in Gorodishchenskoye Rural Settlement, Nyuksensky District, Vologda Oblast, Russia. The population was 12 as of 2002.

Geography 
Nizhnyaya Gorka is located 35 km southeast of Nyuksenitsa (the district's administrative centre) by road. Klimshino is the nearest rural locality.

References 

Rural localities in Nyuksensky District